Acme is an unincorporated community in Columbus County, in the U.S. state of North Carolina.

History
A post office called Acme was established in 1911, and remained in operation until it was discontinued in 1963. The community took its name from the local Acme Manufacturing Company.

References

Unincorporated communities in Columbus County, North Carolina
Unincorporated communities in North Carolina